Ana Jara Martínez (Valencia, November 17, 1995), better known as Ana Jara, is a Spanish actress, dancer, singer, writer, and producer, best known for playing Jimena Medina in the Disney Channel teen series Soy Luna.

Art studies 
Since she was a child, she showed an interest in show business by taking theater, singing, musical comedy, and guitar lessons. She also took dance classes, specializing in different genres.

Career 
In Valencia, he was part of different plays, especially in several musical comedies, but his real leap to fame occurred in 2016 when he was part of the leading cast of the series Soy Luna. In addition, he was part of the soundtracks for the series and participated in the three tours (two in Latin America and one in Europe) of the series.

In 2015, she was part of the cast of the film Woman Rules, and then in 2016 (in parallel with her work in Soy Luna), she produced and starred in a short film.

In 2019, she will reprise her role as Anas in the second season of the Spanish series Bajo la Red, co-starring with Michael Ronda. That same year, she participated in the Atresplayer series Terror app and starred in the play Detrás de la diputada. In January 2020, she created her own theater production company, called La Caprichosa Producciones, acquiring the rights to the play Mamá está mas chiquita.

In 2021, she starred in the series La reina del pueblo In Atresplayer, where she plays Estefi. That same year, she was a guest on the Movistar+ program La resistencia, presented by David Broncano.

Filmography

Cinema

Theater

Tours 

 Soy Luna en concierto (2017) - Latin American tour
 Soy Luna Live (2018) - European tour
 Soy Luna en vivo (2018) - Latin American tour

Books

Awards and nominations

References

External links 
 Ana Jara on IMDb

Spanish women singers
Spanish stage actresses
Spanish television actresses
Living people
1995 births